Samy Sayed Morsy (born 10 September 1991) is a professional footballer who plays as a defensive midfielder for  club Ipswich Town, where he is also club captain. Born in England, he represents the Egypt national team.

He joined the Port Vale youth set-up in 2008, having been released from the Wolverhampton Wanderers Academy. Winning his debut in February 2010, he turned professional at the club in the summer. He established himself in the first-team picture in 2010–11, after which he was given a two-year contract. He helped the club to secure promotion out of League Two in 2012–13. He joined Chesterfield in July 2013, and played for the club in the 2014 final of the Football League Trophy, helping them to win the League Two title in 2013–14. He was sold to Wigan Athletic in January 2016, and helped the club to win the League One title in 2015–16. He joined Barnsley on loan in August 2016, and Wigan were relegated from the Championship upon his return to the club. However he became a key first-team player as they secured an immediate return by winning the League One title again in 2017–18. He was named as Wigan's Player of the Year for the 2019–20 campaign and joined Middlesbrough in September 2020 following administration and relegation at Wigan. He was sold on to Ipswich Town in August 2021.

Club career

Port Vale
Morsy was born in Wolverhampton, West Midlands. He was at the Wolverhampton Wanderers Academy for nine years until 2008, when coach Tony Lacey deemed a sixteen-year-old Morsy to be unworthy of a youth contract. Spotted by Port Vale Youth Development Officer Bill Chetwyn, he was taken to Vale Park for a trial, and was handed a place in the Vale youth team after impressing both Mark Grew and Andy Porter.

By the start of the 2009–10 season, he was being included in the senior squad, being placed on the bench for the League Cup clash with Sheffield United at Bramall Lane. He made his debut on 23 February, replacing Tommy Fraser 83 minutes into a 4–0 home league win over Lincoln City. He was offered his first (one year) professional contract at the end of the season, and was also given the Youth Player of the Year award.

In the 2010–11 pre-season, manager Micky Adams was pleased with Morsy's development, having witnessed the youngster score in two successive friendlies. Morsy promised he would not settle for a cameo role in the season, having just a year to prove his worth at the professional level. On 8 January, new manager Jim Gannon gave Morsy an appearance in Vale's 4–2 FA Cup defeat to Championship side Burnley at Turf Moor. He scored his first senior goal on 22 February, in a 3–1 home defeat to Stevenage. Gannon believed Morsy to be "a really talented footballer" with "all the skills you want in a midfielder". One of the few positives of Gannon's short reign, his rise to prominence put him in line to sign an extended contract. A two-year contract was signed on 1 April. He was also awarded with the club's Young Player of the Year award.

Finding himself on the bench at the start of the 2011–12 campaign under returning manager Micky Adams, on 3 September he scored his second senior goal just thirteen minutes after making his first appearance of the season, in what turned out to be a 3–2 defeat to AFC Wimbledon. After falling out of favour in November, he had to wait another two months until the return fixture with Wimbledon before he started another game, when an injury crisis at the Vale allowed Morsy the chance to deliver "an eye-catching attacking display".

Following the departure of Anthony Griffith, Morsy stepped into the role of 'midfield enforcer' for the 2012–13 campaign. On 25 August, he opened the scoring after just 14 seconds in a 3–1 win over Morecambe at the Globe Arena, earning himself a place on the League Two team of the week. He stated that his aim for the season was "to get more goals", as he formed a "formidable and unshakeable central midfield double act" with Chris Shuker. However, after picking up a suspension in October for receiving five yellow cards, he admitted that "I definitely have to cut down on yellow cards in future". However a "stupid" high two-footed tackle on Rochdale's Jason Kennedy resulted in a straight red for Morsy on 6 November, and was the turning point that left a 2–0 lead for the Vale becoming a 2–2 draw, meaning two points were dropped at home. An angry Micky Adams fined him two weeks' wages (the maximum fine possible) in punishment, and called him a "coward... [who] went to hurt their lad [Kennedy]". Morsy issued an official apology, but insisted that "there was no malice in the challenge". Adams kept him out of the first-team picture for six weeks after the incident, and Morsy stated that "I missed some important matches and that makes you re-evaluate your game." He was more of a bit-part player in the second half of the campaign, as Vale secured promotion with a third-place finish. He rejected the offer of a new two-year contract, and left the club.

Chesterfield
Morsy agreed to sign a two-year deal with League Two club Chesterfield in July 2013, after a fee had been settled with Port Vale, due to Morsy being under the age of 24. Manager Paul Cook said that "When we found out that he may be available, we moved heaven and earth to get him here." On 30 March 2014, he played at Wembley Stadium in Chesterfield's 3–1 defeat to Peterborough United in the final of the Football League Trophy; he provided the assist for Eoin Doyle's goal after "a powerful run into the Posh box". He played a total of 39 games as Chesterfield won promotion as divisional champions in 2013–14, and at the end of the campaign he was voted the club's Player of the Year.

He captained Chesterfield to the League One play-offs in 2014–15, and was reported to be a target for Cardiff City manager Russell Slade in the summer. Milton Keynes Dons also had a bid of £400,000 turned down by Chesterfield.

Wigan Athletic
On 28 January 2016, Morsy agreed a two-and-a-half-year deal with Wigan Athletic after being sold for an undisclosed fee (later reported to be £200,000 plus a 10% sell-on clause for any profit Wigan may make on his future transfer). He was named on the Football League team of the week after he "pulled all the strings" in a 2–1 victory at Walsall on 20 February. He scored his first goal for Wigan in a 4–1 win against Swindon Town on 25 March. Wigan went on to win promotion as champions of League One in the 2015–16 season.

On 31 August 2016, he joined Barnsley on loan for the rest of the 2016–17 season. New Wigan manager Warren Joyce activated the release clause of the loan contract in January 2017, but Joyce was pessimistic over his chances of keeping Morsy at the DW Stadium because previous manager Gary Caldwell had agreed a clause that meant Barnsley could purchase Morsy for a set fee upon expiry of the loan. Morsy returned to Wigan and signed a one-year contract extension on 16 January.

He was named as team captain in August 2017, with Dan Burn also named as "club captain", though it was confirmed Morsy would wear the armband and Burns would deputise in Morsy's absence. Paul Cook led Wigan to a highly successful 2017–18 campaign, with Morsy scoring three goals in 47 appearances as Wigan won promotion as champions of League One for the second time in three seasons. Wigan also made a big impression in the FA Cup, knocking out top-flight sides A.F.C. Bournemouth, West Ham United and Manchester City to reach the quarter-final. Morsy scored in the win over Bournemouth but missed the victory over eventual Premier League champions Manchester City due to suspension.

On 15 September 2018, Morsy was sent off in a 2–0 defeat at Brentford after clashing with Yoann Barbet. However the red card was rescinded on appeal, and three days later he scored in a 2–1 victory over Hull City. He signed a new two-and-a-half-year deal with Wigan in December. He picked up 14 yellow cards in 40 appearances as Wigan posted an 18th-place finish during the 2018–19 season, and he was also ranked sixth for most completed tackles (112) in the Championship. Despite this, he said it was "the unluckiest season I've ever been involved in... and it's credit to us we've been able to overcome all that and stay in the division." He was linked with moves to both Sheffield Wednesday and Brentford in the summer.

He was nominated for the EFL Championship Player of the Month award for February 2020 after scoring two goals, including the only goal of the game at league leaders West Bromwich Albion which took Wigan out of the relegation zone. He scored three goals in 44 games during the 2019–20 season, which ended in relegation after Wigan were controversially deducted 12 points after being placed into administration. Morsy was voted as the club's Player of the Year with 42% of the overall vote.

Middlesbrough
On 11 September 2020, Morsy joined Championship side Middlesbrough on a three-year contract, becoming manager Neil Warnock's third signing of the summer. He made his debut at the Riverside Stadium four days later in a 2–0 defeat to Barnsley in the EFL Cup; after the game first-team coach Ronnie Jepson was encouraged by Morsy's performance and said that "he will give us extra edge". On 16 December, he was sent off for handling the ball during a 1–0 home win over Luton Town, though Warnock said he would appeal the red card. He scored his first goal for Middlesbrough in a 2–1 loss at Swansea City on 6 March. Injuries limited him to 32 appearances in the 2020–21 season, though his consistent performances still earned him a 7-out-of-10 rating in the TeessideLive season review. He was sent off in his final appearance for "Boro", during a 1–1 draw with Blackburn Rovers on 28 August 2021.

Ipswich Town
On 31 August 2021, Morsy joined League One club Ipswich Town on a three-year deal after being signed for an undisclosed fee; arriving as the "Tractor Boys" 19th signing of the summer transfer window, it marked the third time he would play under manager Paul Cook. He was named club captain in October 2021. He scored his first goal for Ipswich on 5 March, netting the opening goal in a 2–0 away win against Fleetwood Town. Speaking later that month, new manager Kieran McKenna said that Morsy was forming a good bond with him. McKenna instructed Morsy to get further forward and score more goals. He was a linked to a move back to the Championship in the summer, though he remained with the club.

International career
Morsy, who was born in England, qualified to represent Egypt as his father is Egyptian. He made his international debut on 30 August 2016 after coming on as a substitute for Mostafa Fathi at half-time in a 1–1 draw with Guinea in a friendly match at Borg El Arab Stadium. He was on the bench as Egypt secured qualification to the 2018 FIFA World Cup with a 2–1 victory over the Congo. In June 2018 he was named in Héctor Cúper's 23-man squad for the 2018 FIFA World Cup in Russia. He made his FIFA World Cup debut in the opening game of the group stage on 15 June, coming on for the injured Tarek Hamed 50 minutes into a 1–0 defeat to Uruguay.

He was recalled to the international set up in September 2021 for World Cup qualifiers against Libya in Cairo and Benghazi. Although he was ultimately left out of the final squad. He was listed in a preliminary squad in May 2022, but was again not named in the final squad.

Style of play
Morsy is an "enforcer" who "relies on his ability to time tackles and break-up play". After leaving Port Vale in June 2013, assistant manager Mark Grew warned Morsy to improve his disciplinary record and temper his aggression in the future, pointing out that he received nine yellow cards and one red card in the 2012–13 campaign.

Career statistics

Club

International

Honours
Port Vale
Football League Two third-place promotion: 2012–13

Chesterfield
Football League Two: 2013–14
Football League Trophy runner-up: 2013–14

Wigan Athletic
Football/EFL League One: 2015–16, 2017–18

Individual
Port Vale Youth Player of the Year: 2009–10
Port Vale Young Player of the Year: 2010–11
Chesterfield Player of the Year: 2013–14
Wigan Athletic Player of the Year: 2019–20

References

External links

Profile at the Ipswich Town F.C. website

1991 births
Living people
Footballers from Wolverhampton
Egyptian footballers
Egypt international footballers
English footballers
Association football midfielders
Port Vale F.C. players
Chesterfield F.C. players
Wigan Athletic F.C. players
Barnsley F.C. players
Middlesbrough F.C. players
Ipswich Town F.C. players
English Football League players
2018 FIFA World Cup players
English people of Egyptian descent